P. Rajendran (Malayalam: പി. രാജേന്ദ്രൻ) (born 28 August 1949) is an Indian politician who is a member of the Communist Party of India (Marxist). He was a member of the 13th as well as 14th Lok Sabha of India. He represented the Kollam Lok Sabha constituency in Kerala. He is a member of the Central Control Commission and Kerala State Committee of the CPI(M).

External links

 Members of Fourteenth Lok Sabha - Parliament of India website

Communist Party of India (Marxist) politicians from Kerala
Living people
1949 births
India MPs 2004–2009
India MPs 1999–2004
Lok Sabha members from Kerala